Shigeto is the stage name of Zachary Shigeto Saginaw, an American electronic musician originally from Ann Arbor, Michigan. His music has a diverse sound, influenced by jazz, his fellow Ghostly artists, and other sources. His melodic, beat oriented songs are a unique blend of instrumental hip hop and electronic music. He briefly attended School of Jazz at The New School in New York City but dropped out in 2003.

Discography
Albums
 Full Circle (Ghostly International, 2010) 
 Lineage (Ghostly International, 2012) 
 No Better Time Than Now (Ghostly International, 2013)
 The New Monday (Ghostly International, 2017)

EPs
"New Crossings EP" (Moodgadget Records, 2008)
"What We Held On To EP" (Ghostly International, 2010)
"Semi Circle EP" (Ghostly International, 2010)
"2010" (Self-Released, 2015) (with Devonwho)
"Intermission EP" (Ghostly International, 2015)
"Weighted" (Ghostly International, 2018)
"Versions" (Ghostly International, 2019)

Remixes
"Full Circle Remixes" (Ghostly International, 2011)

With Dave Douglas
High Risk (Greenleaf, 2015)
Dark Territory (Greenleaf, 2016)

References

American electronic musicians
Living people
Year of birth missing (living people)